The Commission Inquiring into the Insurance Industry, also known as The Hancox Commission was a Kenya Government Commission established on 17 October 1986. The Commission's only member was Justice Allan Robin Winston Hancox who was to be assisted by Mary Ang'awa

Report
The Commission's report was released only to selected stakeholders within the insurance industry and, to date has not been formally released to the public.

References

Law of Kenya